Jiří Sýkora (born 20 January 1995 in Třebíč) is a Czech athlete competing in the combined events. He represented his country at the 2016 Summer Olympics in Rio de Janeiro where he finished last after scoring no points in the pole vault and 1500 metres. In addition he won the gold medal at the 2014 World Junior Championships. He is also the former world record holder in the junior decathlon.

International competitions

Personal bests

Outdoor
100 metres – 10.86 (+1.1 m/s, Götzis 2016)
400 metres – 48.80 (Ribeira Brava 2014)
1000 metres – 3:00.68 (Lille 2011)
1500 metres – 4:36.47 (Götzis 2016)
110 metres hurdles – 14.15 (+1.5 m/s, Bydgoszcz 2017)
High jump – 2.02 (Prague 2014)
Pole vault – 4.85 (Plzeň 2021)
Long jump – 7.64 (-0.3 m/s, Tábor 2013)
Shot put – 15.22 (Plzen 2017)
Discus throw – 50.67 (Hradec Králové 2017)
Javelin throw – 66.91 (Arona 2021)
Decathlon – 8122 (Arona 2021)

Indoor
60 metres – 6.99 (Prague 2017)
1000 metres – 2:47.48 (Prague 2019)
60 metres hurdles – 7.95 (Prague 2019)
High jump – 2.00 (Sheffield 2014)
Pole vault – 4.90 (Belgrade 2017)
Long jump – 7.66 (Prague 2016)
Shot put – 15.09 (Glasgow 2019)
Heptathlon – 6006 (Prague 2019)

References

1995 births
Living people
Sportspeople from Třebíč
Czech decathletes
Athletes (track and field) at the 2016 Summer Olympics
Olympic athletes of the Czech Republic
Czech Athletics Championships winners
Athletes (track and field) at the 2020 Summer Olympics